Santa Margherita di Belice (Sicilian: Santa Margarita) is a town in the Province of Agrigento in the Italian region of Sicily.

History
In this territory there is evidence of settlements and remains of Sicanians, Greeks and Romans, and the town had once been a mountaintop stronghold of Berbers and later of Arab civilization. It is only thanks to them in this area who made the foundations of the hamlet "Casale of Manzil-Sindi" (named after their leader, Muhammed-ibi-as-Sindi).

Afterwards with the arrival of the Normans, the territory of Casale Manzil-Sindi was named "Misilindino" or "Misirindino", then it became part of the feudal estate of a Spanish nobleman, Baron Antonio de Corbera, responsible for the first built-up area in 1572. Only in 1610 King Filippo III, releasing the "licentia populandi", authorized Baron Girolano Corbera, Baron Antonio's nephew, to establish the new village, who named it Santa Margherita, with an ambitious architectural program, the most spectacular result of which was the Palazzo Filangeri-Cutò built around 1680.
The princes Filangeri, who succeeded the barons Corbera, gave impetus to the village by construction of several buildings and increasing the population. Among Filangeri of Santa Margherita di Belìce are included three viceroys of Sicily: Alessandro I, Alessandro II, and Nicolò I. In 1812 for about three months, Nicolo I hosted King Ferdinando, Queen Maria Carolina (the Donnafugata) and Prince Leopoldo di Borbone in the Palazzo of Santa Margherita.

During the night of 15 January 1968, a violent and massive earthquake devastated Santa Margherita di Belice and the surrounding town in the Belice river area, forever changing the lifestyle of its inhabitants.
  A new town was built adjacent to the old town.  Many of the damaged structures from the earthquake are still standing, including the ruined palace of Giuseppe Tomasi di Lampedusa and the Palazzo Filangeri-Cutò. The author immortalized the palace in his novel, The Leopard, under the name Donnafugata.

Main sights
Palazzo Filangeri di Cutò, best known as Palazzo Gattopardo. Only the façade survived the 1968 earthquake, and now has been partially rebuilt. It is currently home of the municipality, of the Gattopardo Museum, the St. Alexander Theatre and of the Literary Park Giuseppe Tomasi di Lampedusa.
Museum of the Memory, located in the remains of the former Mother Church. It houses historical photos about the Belice valley towns.
Villa del Gattopardo, dating to the late 17th century and described by Tomasi di Lampedusa in his novel, I Ricordi d'Infanzia.

References

External links
 www.comune.santamargheritadibelice.ag.it/

Populated places established in 1572
1572 establishments in Italy